Martin Stenersen (20 November 1879 – 15 April 1968) was a Norwegian shooter who competed in the early 20th century in rifle shooting.

He was born in Vestby. At the 1924 Summer Olympics he finished nineteenth in the trap event and seventh in the team clay pigeons event.

He died in 1968 in Riverside, California.

References

1879 births
1968 deaths
People from Vestby
Norwegian emigrants to the United States
ISSF rifle shooters
Norwegian male sport shooters
Shooters at the 1924 Summer Olympics
Olympic shooters of Norway
Sportspeople from Viken (county)